The 1892 Calgary municipal election was scheduled for January 4, 1892 to elect a Mayor and six Councillors to sit on the eighth Calgary Town Council from January 18, 1892 to January 16, 1893.

Results

Mayor
Alexander Lucas - 210 votes

Councillors
George Clift King - 210 votes
Issac Sanford Freeze - 201 votes
Wesley Fletcher Orr - 188 votes
Alexander McBride - 186 votes
James Reilly - 180  votes
William Henry Cushing - 171 votes
Ford - 143 votes
Muir - 125 votes
Thomas Underwood - 69 votes
Parish - 34 votes

See also
List of Calgary municipal elections

References

Sources
Frederick Hunter: THE MAYORS AND COUNCILS  OF  THE CORPORATION OF CALGARY Archived March 3, 2020

Municipal elections in Calgary
1892 elections in Canada
1890s in Calgary